Itihad Riadhi Baladiat de Maghnia, known as IRB Maghnia or IRBM for short, is an Algerian football club based in the city of Maghnia in the Tlemcen Province. The club was founded in 1928 and its colours are green and white. Their home stadium, Nouali Brothers Stadium, has a capacity of 8,000 spectators. The club is currently playing in the Inter-Régions Division.

History
IRB Maghnia was formed in 1928 as Société Sportive d'éducation Physique de Maghnia (SSEPM). In 1971, the club changed its name to Ittihad Riadi Maghnia (IRM), and again in 1977 to its current name of Ittihad Riadi Baladiat Maghnia (IRBM).

In the 2010–2011 season, IRB Maghnia finished in fifth place in the Centre-Ouest division of the Championnat National de Football Amateur.

References

Football clubs in Algeria
Association football clubs established in 1928
Tlemcen Province
1928 establishments in Algeria
Sports clubs in Algeria